Celestial Emporium of Benevolent Knowledge is a fictitious taxonomy of animals described by the writer Jorge Luis Borges in his 1942 essay "The Analytical Language of John Wilkins".

Overview
Wilkins, a 17th-century philosopher, had proposed a universal language based on a classification system that would encode a description of the thing a word describes into the word itself—for example, Zi identifies the genus beasts; Zit denotes the "difference" rapacious beasts of the dog kind; and finally Zitα specifies dog.

In response to this proposal and in order to illustrate the arbitrariness and cultural specificity of any attempt to categorize the world, Borges describes this example of an alternate taxonomy, supposedly taken from an ancient Chinese encyclopaedia entitled Celestial Emporium of Benevolent Knowledge. The list divides all animals into 14 categories.

Borges claims that the list was discovered in its Chinese source by the translator Franz Kuhn.

In his essay, Borges compares this classification with one allegedly used at the time by the Institute of Bibliography in Brussels, which he considers similarly chaotic. Borges says the Institute divides the universe in 1000 sections, of which number 262 is about the Pope, ironically classified apart from section 264, that on the Roman Catholic Church. Meanwhile section 294 encompasses all four of Hinduism, Shinto, Buddhism and Taoism. He also finds excessive heterogeneity in section 179, which includes animal cruelty, suicide, mourning, and an assorted group of vices and virtues.

Borges concludes: "there is no description of the universe that isn't arbitrary and conjectural for a simple reason: we don't know what the universe is". Nevertheless, he finds Wilkins' language to be clever (ingenioso) in its design, as arbitrary as it may be. He points out that in a language with a divine scheme of the universe, beyond human capabilities, the name of an object would include the details of its entire past and future.

Influences of the list 
This list has stirred considerable philosophical and literary commentary.

Michel Foucault begins his preface to The Order of Things,

Foucault then quotes Borges' passage.

Louis Sass has suggested, in response to Borges' list, that such "Chinese" thinking shows signs of typical schizophrenic thought processes. By contrast, the linguist George Lakoff has pointed out that while Borges' list is not possibly a human categorization, many categorizations of objects found in nonwestern cultures have a similar feeling to Westerners.

Keith Windschuttle, an Australian historian, cited alleged acceptance of the authenticity of the list by many academics as a sign of the degeneration of the Western academy and a terminal lack of humor.

Attribution 

Scholars have questioned whether the attribution of the list to Franz Kuhn is genuine. While Kuhn did indeed translate Chinese literature, Borges' works often feature many learned pseudo-references resulting in a mix of facts and fiction. To date, no evidence for the existence of such a list has been found.

Borges himself questions the veracity of the quote in his essay, referring to "the unknown (or false) Chinese encyclopaedia writer".

See also 
 An Essay towards a Real Character and a Philosophical Language, the 1668 work of philosopher John Wilkins that was the subject of Borges' essay
 Book of Imaginary Beings, Borges' bestiary, a catalog of fantastic animals
 Emic and etic (a corollary of Borges' point is that although etic classifications are less arbitrary than emic ones, all human efforts at etic classification are bound by the limits of human understanding and thus are imperfectly etic)
 Entish, a theoretical imaginary language in J. R. R. Tolkien's The Lord of the Rings, where tree creatures name objects by relating what they know of their entire past, similarly to Borges' divine language in this essay
 Leishu – a genre of reference books historically compiled in China and other countries of the Sinosphere

References 


Classification systems
Jorge Luis Borges
Michel Foucault
Sociology of knowledge
Taxonomy
Taxonomy (biology)
Fictional elements introduced in 1942